Nepali Sikhs first entered Nepal in the 18th century. Today, there is a small community of Sikhs living in Nepal, totaling around 609 people according to the 2011 census and confirmed by MOFA(Ministry Of Foreign Affairs) Nepal.

Background
Guru Nanak Dev, the founder of Sikhism, spent more than a year meditating on a site now known as Nanak Math, located in Balaju, Kathmandu. It is believed that Guru Nanak visited the math in 1516. Guru Nanak is traditionally locally known as Nanak Rishi in Nepal.

Following conflict with the British East India Company, Maharani Jind Kaur, the youngest wife of Maharaja Ranjit Singh, managed to escape from the Punjab disguised as a servant girl and came to Nepal via Nepalgunj on 29 April, 1849. The Nepalese government gave her shelter. Later, she went to London, but those Sikhs who remained in Nepal started their livelihood there. A few Nepalgunj territories near the Indian border are still called Shikhhanpurwa, Jamunaha and Bankatwa.

See also
Sikh diaspora
Sikhism by country

References

External links

Nepal
Religion in Nepal
Nep